US Post Office-Owego is a historic post office building located at Owego in Tioga County, New York.  It was designed in 1917 and built in 1919-1920 and is one of a number of post offices in New York State designed by the Office of the Supervising Architect under James A. Wetmore. It is a symmetrical one story, red brick clad building on a raised foundation executed in the Colonial Revival style.  It is a contributing structure in the Owego Central Historic District.

It was listed on the National Register of Historic Places in 1988.

References

Owego
Colonial Revival architecture in New York (state)
Government buildings completed in 1920
Buildings and structures in Tioga County, New York
National Register of Historic Places in Tioga County, New York
Individually listed contributing properties to historic districts on the National Register in New York (state)